Funny Girl is the original Broadway cast recording of the musical of the same name, starring Barbra Streisand. The Funny Girl cast album peaked at No. 2 on the Billboard 200 in June 1964, selling 250,000 copies by the following month. The recording went on to beat Fiddler on the Roof and Hello, Dolly! to win the Grammy for Best Original Cast Show Album.

Production
The Broadway show opened on March 26, 1964, at the Winter Garden Theater, and the cast album was recorded in a one-day session in early April, then released one week later by Capitol Records. Streisand performs twelve of the album's seventeen tracks, and the album marked the first time a Streisand recording was not released through Columbia. Streisand was already a successful singer at the time, with her prior three studio albums charting in the Billboard top 10.

Track listing

Charts

Weekly charts

Year-end charts

Certifications

See also
Diana Ross & the Supremes Sing and Perform "Funny Girl", released on the Motown label in 1968
Funny Girl soundtrack to the 1968 film adaptation

References 

Cast recordings
1964 soundtrack albums
Barbra Streisand soundtracks